Gustavo 'Guti' Beirão Gramaço Ribeiro (born 1 December 1984 in Almada, Setúbal District) is a Portuguese former professional footballer who played as a forward.

External links

1984 births
Living people
Sportspeople from Almada
Portuguese footballers
Association football forwards
C.D. Montijo players
Sportfreunde Siegen players
Tercera División players
SD Compostela footballers
Football League (Greece) players
Liga 1 (Indonesia) players
Persijap Jepara players
St. Andrews F.C. players
Cypriot Second Division players
Onisilos Sotira players
IFK Mariehamn players
Portuguese expatriate footballers
Portuguese expatriate sportspeople in Germany
Expatriate footballers in Germany
Portuguese expatriate sportspeople in Spain
Expatriate footballers in Spain
Portuguese expatriate sportspeople in Greece
Expatriate footballers in Greece
Portuguese expatriate sportspeople in Indonesia
Expatriate footballers in Indonesia
Portuguese expatriate sportspeople in Malta
Expatriate footballers in Malta
Portuguese expatriate sportspeople in Cyprus
Expatriate footballers in Cyprus
Portuguese expatriate sportspeople in Finland
Expatriate footballers in Finland
Portuguese expatriate sportspeople in Austria
Expatriate footballers in Austria